The Islamic Education Society is an Islamic organization in Bahrain that follows and promotes the conservative Salafist ideology. It participates in politics through its political wing, Asalah.

It runs a number of charities and welfare projects, in addition to its Islamic proselytization activities.

Established 1978, it owns and operates Al-Iman School, with annual revenue of over BD 1m.

The Malayalam language wing of the society was named the Al Furqan Centre. This centre was founded and registered as “Markaz Al Furqan Li Tahfeezil Quran” and carried out it activities in the file of Dawah and Quranic Teaching, under the supervision of Islamic Education Society. In 2010 it was re-introduced and registered under the Ministry of Justice and Islamic Affairs, Directorate of Religious Affairs, Department of Research and Information by the name of “Al Furqan Centre for Expatriate Communities".

See also
 Islam in Bahrain

External links
Islamic Education Society website (Arabic)
Al Furqan Centre for Expatriate Communities website (English)
Online Islamic Academic website (English)

Islamic organisations based in Bahrain
Educational organisations based in Bahrain
Salafi groups
1978 establishments in Bahrain
Organizations established in 1978